Lonnie Gene Clark (born January 1, 1944) is an American politician. He has served as a Republican member for the 65th district in the Kansas House of Representatives since 2015. He is an Episcopalian.

References

1944 births
Living people
Republican Party members of the Kansas House of Representatives
21st-century American politicians
American Episcopalians
Emporia State University alumni
Drake University alumni